"Substitute" is a song by Willie H. Wilson, recorded first by The Righteous Brothers and released as a single from their album The Sons of Mrs. Righteous in 1975. A 1978 version by the South African all-female band Clout was a global hit.

Clout version
In 1978, the song became a big hit for the South African band Clout, reaching No. 2 in the UK charts in August and being certified Gold by the BPI. It fared even better in the rest of Europe, Africa and Oceania where it reached No. 1 in Germany, Ireland, New Zealand and South Africa, as well as No. 2 in Belgium, the Netherlands and Switzerland. It fared exceptionally well on the annual charts too, reaching the Top 20 on the final year-end singles charts in the Netherlands, New Zealand, South Africa, Switzerland and the UK. This version was produced by Grahame Beggs.

Track listing
 "Substitute" (W.H. Wilson) – 3:28
 "When Will You Be Mine" (Carolyne Martin) – 2:59

Chart history

Weekly charts

Year-end charts

Sales and certifications

Other versions
Australian group Peaches also charted locally at the same time, peaking at number 15 on the Australian chart.
Gloria Gaynor in 1978 (U.S. #107) and by Polish-Swedish singer and actor Izabella Scorupco in 1990.

References

1975 songs
1975 singles
1978 singles
The Righteous Brothers songs
Gloria Gaynor songs
Irish Singles Chart number-one singles
Number-one singles in Germany
Number-one singles in New Zealand
Number-one singles in South Africa